Ophiusa dilecta is a moth of the family Erebidae. It is found in Africa, including Sierra Leone, Príncipe and South Africa.

References
  (1989). Lepidopterorum Catalogus (New Series) Fascicle 118, Noctuidae. CRC Press. , 

Ophiusa
Moths of Africa
Insects of West Africa
Moths described in 1865